Ashton Lewis Jr. (born January 22, 1972) is an American former stock car racing driver who competed in 226 races over 11 seasons. Lewis earned a degree in mechanical engineering from Old Dominion University in Norfolk, Virginia. After his racing career, he earned his MBA from the Fuqua School of Business at Duke University. As of March 2013, he is chief operating officer for First Team Automotive Group in Chesapeake, Virginia.

Busch Series career 

Lewis was a driver who was especially good on road courses. He started out in the Barber Saab Pro Series for the 1992 season. After success in that series, he was offered a scholarship to race in the British Formula Ford championship.

Lewis made his Busch debut in 1993, long before he became known to most Busch fans. Driving the No. 36 Parkway Pontiac at Watkins Glen, Lewis started the race in 29th place. The team had mechanical issues partway through the race, but Lewis got back on track and finished the race in 27th place.

Lewis returned once again to the series in 1994. This time, Lewis drove the No. 80 Commerce Bank Chevy at Milwaukee Mile. Lewis was able to top his debut with a 24th-place effort despite a 38th-place start.

Lewis again made a one-off start in 1995. He had his best weekend at that point in his career, this time back at Watkins Glen. He started the race solidly in the 22nd position and stayed on the lead lap with a 13th-place finishing result.

Lewis raced in eight races in 1996 and earned a 3rd-place finish at Watkins Glen. He led three laps during the race, the first laps led of his Busch Series career.

Lewis did not compete in 1999 but came back in 2000, with a new family owned No. 46 Chevy. He completed an 11-race schedule with a best finish of 17th at Michigan. 

With a decent first year under their belt, Lewis Motorsports ran all but one race in 2001, leading to a 20th-place standing in points. Lewis earned three top-10s in 2001: A pair of fifths at Kentucky and Charlotte and a ninth at Memphis, an impressive feat without a full-time sponsor. Lewis earned his best start of 2001 at Las Vegas, with a 5th place starting position. However, Lewis struggled to finish races and had nine DNFs.

Yet, the team was optimistic. The team would run 2002 with new sponsor Civil Air Patrol. Lewis only had one top-5, but it was a solid one. Lewis started 24th at his home track of Richmond International Raceway but certainly ran well, moving to a 2nd-place finish. In addition, Lewis earned a triplet of 8th and another triplet of 9th. Lewis was also qualifying well, with 5 top-10 starts, the best being a 3rd at IRP. The only reason that Lewis finished a lowly 17th was simple: a series-high 12 DNFs.

Lewis set out to better his season in 2003 and did it well. Cutting down his DNFs to five led to a 12th-place finish in points. The highlight of his season came at Gateway. He won the pole and led forty-four laps and was running fifth when Randy Lajoie crashed in front of him and led to a 33rd-place finish. However, Ashton did have better overall finishes. He had two top-5s with a 3rd at Nashville and a 5th at Homestead-Miami. Lewis also tacked on eight other top-10 finishes, to have ten top-10 finishes in 2003.

The team lost CAP after 2003, however, and the team could not attract a sponsor for 2004. The team would end up running the whole season, but Lewis' family team had to shut down following the season. Yet, Lewis made one great swan song at the end of the season. A late-season surge put Lewis in position to win races. That was apparent at Darlington, where Lewis ran a specially painted tribute car to a second-place finish, barely losing to Jamie McMurray. Even though there was some sadness in the team's hearts, Lewis finished 8th place in points, his first career top-10 

Lewis would drive the No. 25 Marines Ford in 2005 and 2006 for Ed Rensi. Lewis finished the 2005 campaign 14th in points. The 2006 season yielded a disappointing 15th-place finish in points. Lewis ended his NASCAR career after the 2006 season having competed in 226 Busch Series races over 11 different seasons.

Motorsports career results

NASCAR
(key) (Bold – Pole position awarded by qualifying time. Italics – Pole position earned by points standings or practice time. * – Most laps led.)

Busch Series

References

External links

Living people
1972 births
Sportspeople from Chesapeake, Virginia
Racing drivers from Virginia
NASCAR drivers
Old Dominion University alumni
Barber Pro Series drivers
RFK Racing drivers